A Blaze in the Northern Sky is the second studio album by Norwegian black metal band Darkthrone. It was recorded at Creative Studios in August 1991 and released on 26 February 1992 by Peaceville Records. It contained the band's first black metal recordings and is considered a classic within the genre. It was the first album of what fans dub the "Unholy Trinity", the other albums being Under a Funeral Moon and Transilvanian Hunger. It was the last album to feature bassist Dag Nilsen. In 2020, the album was put on the National Library of Norway's permanent exhibition due to its significance to Norwegian culture and as a starting point for Norwegian Black Metal.

Background 
Darkthrone's first album, 1991's Soulside Journey, was a Swedish-styled death metal release. After recording Soulside Journey, the band began writing songs with more black metal traits. This yielded the instrumental demo Goatlord.

After recording Goatlord, three of the band members—Fenriz, Nocturno Culto and Zephyrous—decided that they wanted to focus on making black metal music. Bassist Nilsen disliked this shift in direction, and quit the band. However, he agreed to record his bass parts for the album as a session member. A Blaze in the Northern Sky was recorded during August 1991 at Creative Studios in Kolbotn; the same studio where Mayhem recorded their influential Deathcrush EP. In an interview, Fenriz said that the album was somewhat "rushed" and that many of the songs have "death metal guitar riffs" played in a "black metal style".

Due to Darkthrone's sudden change from death metal to black metal, Peaceville was unwilling to release the album as it was. The shocked record label had expected that the band would continue recording death metal in the vein of Soulside Journey. Peaceville agreed to release the album only if they were able to remix it, stating that the sound was "too weak". The band then threatened to release it through Deathlike Silence Productions, the record label owned by Øystein "Euronymous" Aarseth of Mayhem (to whom the album is dedicated). However, Peaceville eventually agreed to release the album as it was recorded.

Release 
The album was released by Peaceville on 26 February 1992. The first CD pressing was limited to 2,000 copies and had a white disc. The front cover featured Ivar Enger (Zephyrous), the band's rhythm guitarist.

It was remastered and reissued by Peaceville in 2003, as well as being repackaged in a cardboard digipak. The second chapter of a four-part video interview (spanning the first four albums) with Fenriz and Nocturno was also included. A Blaze was reissued again by Peaceville in December 2009 as a double gatefold LP on 180 gram vinyl, limited to 2,000 copies.

Critical reception 

In his retrospective review of the album, Eduardo Rivadavia from AllMusic gave A Blaze 5 out of 5 stars, calling it "a classic whose almost indefensibly lo-fi standards would reinvigorate an entire strain of black metal". Valefor from Metal Reviews wrote that it "would come to epitomize True Black Metal [...] raw production, simple riffs, no color on their album covers... just pure frozen evil." Channing Freeman of Sputnikmusic called the album "triumphant", with a balanced blend of "frozen production and guttural screams" and "a sense of community".

In 2009, IGN included A Blaze in the Northern Sky in their "10 Great Black Metal Albums" list, while a 2007 article in Decibel magazine called it "the first truly blackened death metal album". Kerrang! called it "a dark watershed for the black metal genre" and the song In the Shadow of the Horns as "seven minutes of defiant lo-fi production, frostbitten purpose and blunt-force simplicity".

Track listing

Personnel

Darkthrone 
 Nocturno Culto – lead guitar, vocals
 Zephyrous – rhythm guitar
 Fenriz – drums, backing vocals

Additional musicians 
 Dag Nilsen – bass guitar

Production 
 Dave Pybus – album cover design

References 

Darkthrone albums
1992 albums
Peaceville Records albums